TDRS-13, known before launch as TDRS-M, is an American communications satellite operated by NASA as part of the Tracking and Data Relay Satellite System. The thirteenth Tracking and Data Relay Satellite, it is the third and final third-generation spacecraft to be launched, following the 2014 launch of TDRS-12.

Spacecraft 
TDRS-M was constructed by Boeing, based on the BSS-601HP satellite bus. It carries two steerable antennas capable of providing S, Ku and Ka band communications for other spacecraft, with an additional array of S-band transponders for lower-rate communications with five further satellites. The satellite is powered by two solar arrays, which produce 2.8 to 3.2 kilowatts of power, while an R-4D-11-300 engine is present to provide propulsion.

Launch 
In 2015, NASA contracted with United Launch Alliance to launch TDRS-M on an Atlas V 401 for $132.4 million. The spacecraft was launched on 18 August 2017 at 12:29 UTC (08:29 local time) from Space Launch Complex-41 at Cape Canaveral Air Force Station.

Damage during final closeouts 
On 15 July 2017, The TDRS-M space communications satellite was damaged during the encapsulation process at Astrotech Space Operations.

According to NASA's press release, "NASA and Boeing are reviewing an incident that occurred during final spacecraft closeout activities on the Tracking Data Relay Satellite (TDRS-M) mission at Astrotech Space Operations in Titusville, Florida, on July 14, involving the Omni S-band antenna." This incident did result in a launch delay.

See also 
 List of TDRS satellites

References

TDRS satellites
Spacecraft launched in 2017
Spacecraft launched by Atlas rockets